Stones in the Sun is a 2012 Haitian American film written and directed by Patricia Benoit and starring Edwidge Danticat, Michele Marcelin, Diana Masi, Thierry Saintine, Patricia Rhinvil, James Noel, and Carlo Mitton. It premiered at the 2012 Tribeca Film Festival, where it won the Special Jury Prize for Best Narrative Director.

Plot
In the midst of increasing political violence, a young couple, two sisters, and a father and son are driven from Haiti to New York, where they must confront the truths of their interlocked past.

Production
Principal photography took place over 21 days in New York City, 4 days in Jacmel, Haiti, and half a day at the Miami International Airport during the crew's layover between New York and Haiti.

Awards
The film has won the following awards:
 Special Jury Prize for Best Narrative Director, 2012 Tribeca Film Festival 
 Best Diaspora Feature, 9th Africa Movie Academy Awards
 Best Narrative Feature, 2013 Pan African Film Festival
 Jury Award for Best Feature, 2013 Teaneck International Film Festival

Previously, the script won the Sundance Time Warner Storytelling Award, the Sundance Annenberg Award, and a Jerome Foundation Grant.

References

External links
Stones in the Sun at the Internet Movie Database
Stones in the Sun on Rotten Tomatoes

Best Diaspora Feature Africa Movie Academy Award winners
2012 films
Haitian drama films
Haitian Creole-language films
English-language Haitian films